Kassin is a surname. Notable people with the surname include:

 Elmo Kassin (born 1969), Estonian cross-country skier
 Katja Kassin (born 1979), German actress
 Sam Kassin (born 1944), American educator
 Saul Kassin (born 1953), American psychologist

See also
 Bkassine, village in Lebanon